Harley Davidson:The Road to Sturgis, is a video game produced by Mindscape, Inc. in 1989. The game received mixed reviews after its release, some gamers citing the graphics as better than average, and others disappointed in how quickly the game became "tedious" and "repetitive" and could be beaten. The point of the game is to get to the annual motorcycle rally in Sturgis in 10 days. To get there you must ride on the highway, avoiding obstacles and stopping at pit stops.

References

 1989 video games
Video games developed in the United States
Mindscape games